Ronald David Allan (3 March 1924 – 21 May 1997) was an Australian rules footballer who played with North Melbourne in the Victorian Football League (VFL).

Career
Allan, a utility from West Melbourne, played with the North Melbourne seconds during the war, but had to wait until he left to army to make his senior debut. He made 14 league appearances for North Melbourne, from 1946 to 1949.

Midway through the 1949 season, Allan got a clearance to Brighton, in the Victorian Football Association (VFA). In 1950, Allan captained the North Melbourne seconds team, which finished runners-up. He returned to the VFA in 1951, joining Preston, then in 1952 moved to Tasmania to captain-coach North West Football Union club Latrobe. His time in charge of Latrobe included a top four finish in 1953.

Family
His son, Barry, played for North Melbourne in the 1960s.

References

1924 births
Australian rules footballers from Melbourne
North Melbourne Football Club players
Brighton Football Club players
Preston Football Club (VFA) players
Latrobe Football Club players
Australian Army personnel of World War II
1997 deaths
Australian Army soldiers
Military personnel from Melbourne